Masahiko Kimura is a Japanese judo practitioner.

Masahiko Kimura is the name of:

 Masahiko Kimura (bonsai artist) (born 1940), Japanese bonsai artist
 Masahiko Kimura (footballer) (born 1984), Japanese association football player